Natalie Hammond may refer to:

Natalie Hays Hammond, American artist, author, and inventor
Natalie Hammond, shot but survived in the Sandy Hook Elementary School shooting in Newtown, Connecticut